Nation Estate is a 2013 Palestinian movie directed by Larissa Sansour. It is a sci-fi short film that depicts Palestine as a skyscraper, with each floor representing a city in Palestine. An earlier version of the project garnered attention when it was removed from a competition at the Musée de l'Elysée, allegedly due to its political connotations.

Plot 

The film starts with a pregnant woman arriving at a train station. She makes her way up an escalator with a travel bag in hand. At the top of the escalator she uses a fingerprint and retinal scan to enter a lobby and walks over to the elevators. As she pushes the button, she looks over to a poster on the wall that reads "Nation Estate: Living the High Life". Next to the elevator is a directory for the building floors. Each floor is described as a city or area in Palestine. In the elevator, advertisements play on a television screen. The advertisements seems to address different social and political issues that Palestinians face today, such as water supply, food and travelling restrictions. The first stop the elevator makes is on the 13th floor, Jerusalem. As two other 'travelers' make their way off the elevator, you can see the Al-Aqsa Mosque. The next stop is Bethlehem. As the woman steps off the elevator and walks away, the city's old architecture can be seen as the basis for the floor. She walks into a tunnel that seems to be authentic stone and mortar from the outside, but is more modern on the inside. She stops at a door, and using a keycard in the form of a Palestinian flag, she opens up the door to an apartment. She sets the keycard down, and picks up a watering can. She heads over to a window, and in front of the window, there is a tree growing out of the ground and she waters it. Afterwards, she heads over to a cabinet and opens it up, revealing multicolored cans. When she grabs one and looks at it, it has a label that says 'Mloukhieh', a food native to the Middle East and North Africa. She returns the can and reaches for another, this time it is 'Marmaon'. She heats it up using a fingerprint and pours it out into a bowl, along with other food. She sets it down on the table and makes her way to the window. After pressing a button on the wall, the view changes into one of Jerusalem. The woman holds her belly as she looks on to the city.

Controversy 

In 2011, a multimedia project of the same name by the film’s director, Larissa Sansour, was selected to be a part of the Lacoste Elysée Competition. However, after being shortlisted for a prize by the museum, Larissa was contacted by the museum staff, informing her that her film was deemed "too pro-Palestinian" by the people from Lacoste, allegations which the company later denied. The museum also requested that Sansour release a statement saying that she had "decided to pursue other opportunities."

After the work’s removal sparked outrage, Lacoste ended its sponsorship of the £21,000 prize while the gallery in turn suspended its relationship with the company.

Film festivals 

 Prize of the Ecumenical Jury – Oberhausen International Short Film Festival 2013 
 Rotterdam International Film Festival 2013
 Best Short Film of the Critics Jury – International Festival of Arab Cinemas Marseille 2013
 International Oriental Film Festival Geneva 2013
 Bucharest International Experimental Film Festival 2013

References

External links

Palestinian short films
Danish short films
2013 films
2013 short films